Eshtabraq  is a Syrian village in Jisr al-Shughur Nahiyah in Jisr al-Shughur District, Idlib.  According to the Syria Central Bureau of Statistics (CBS), it had a population of 1187 in the 2004 census.

On 25 April 2015, after Jabhat al-Nusra and Islamist allies in the "Army of Conquest" seized Jisr al-Shughour, they attacked the Alawite village of Eshtabraq and killed over 200 of its residents.

References 

Populated places in Jisr al-Shughur District